The Reine-class patrol vessel is a modified version of the s. It is a Norwegian inshore patrol vessel designed for the specific needs of the Norwegian Sea Home Guard. It has the capacity to carry smaller patrol vessels and containers on board. The class is operated by the Royal Norwegian Navy, but also used as a platform for Home Guard training.

Design 
The Reine class consists of two vessels of the ST-610 L design by Skipsteknisk AS, built at the Gryfia shipyard in Szczecin, Poland. The vessels were ordered in 2007 and delivered in 2010 and 2011. The class constituted a new capacity for the Norwegian Sea Home Guard and was the first larger modern purpose built vessels in the fleet.

Ships in class 
The vessels of the Reine class are named after Norwegian kings. The Norwegian prefix for the vessels were originally SHV short for Sjøheimevernet or "Sea Home Guard", but later changed as they were transferred to the navy.

  (P380)
  (P381)

In 2013 the two vessels in the Reine class were transferred from the Sea Home Guard to the Royal Norwegian Navy.  HNoMS Olav Trygvason (A536) and HNoMS Magnus Lagabøte (A537) are in use by the Naval Logistics Branch.

References

External links
 

Patrol vessels of Norway
Patrol boat classes